Larry Nesper is an American anthropologist specializing in the Ojibwe (a.k.a. Chippewa) people of northern Wisconsin.

He received his Ph.D. in 1994 from the University of Chicago, where he studied with Raymond D. Fogelson.

He teaches anthropology at the University of Wisconsin, Madison.

Bibliography

 Kan, Sergei A., and Pauline Turner Strong, eds. (2006) New Perspectives on Native North America: Cultures, Histories, and Representations.  Lincoln: University of Nebraska Press.
 Nesper, Larry (2002) The Walleye War: The Struggle for Ojibwe Spearfishing and Treaty Rights.  Lincoln: University of Nebraska Press.

American anthropologists
Living people
Year of birth missing (living people)
University of Chicago alumni